Pehchan is a 1975 Pakistani action-drama film directed by Pervaiz Malik. The film stars Nadeem and Shabnam, with Sabiha Khanam, Qavi Khan, and Munawar Saeed playing supporting roles. The film revolves around a family that lost its sole heir. The music was composed by Nisar Bazmi. It released on 1 August 1975 and was a success at the box office. At the 1975 Nigar Awards, the film received two awards.

Plot 
The story starts when the mother of a young boy named Janu dies at a railway station. Afterwards, a rich woman's secretary takes him to her mistress's house. The Mistress welcomes Janu and raises him with her son, Rashid. While playing, Rashid mistakenly shoots Janu and runs away, leaving the city out of fear of being arrested. However, nothing happens to Janu and the bullet just touches him. Unfortunately, Rashid gets trapped by a rich man who uses him for illegal activities.

Several years later, Janu is now closer with the Mistress and handles all of her properties. Sara, the daughter of the Mistress's husband, comes to live with them. She educates the villagers women about their health and family planning but Janu calls them vulgar things. He also teases Sara at different events, so she decides to leave the village. When Janu learns that she is leaving the village he stops her and confesses his love for her.

One day, Mistress is saddened remembering her lost son Rashid, so Janu decides to help her by placing a newspaper advertisement about Rashid's years-long absence from his family. Rashid sees the advertisement and decides to come back home. During his journey on the train, Rashid reveals the details of his situation to an unknown person, who turns out to be a criminal. The criminal decides to kill Rashid and disguise as him so that he can steal his property, so he injures Rashid by throwing him out of the train.

When the disguised Rashid goes home everyone notices his strange behaviour. He gets angry whenever Rashid's childhood is discussed. One day, the Mistress's secretary brings another person to the house. He seems to be irrational, but the person is actually Rashid. When the fake Rashid learns of his arrival he tries to kill him but fails, creating doubts in Janu's mind that the disguised Rashid is legitimate. An old Fakirni who has been living in the village for years comes across the unstable Rashid, feels his presence and tells Janu that he is the real Rashid. Janu is shocked and decides to expose the fake Rashid in front of everyone, but he fails and no-one believes him. The fake Rashid tells the Mistress to secure his marriage with Sara. Although Sara denies him at first, she later agrees after Janu approves it. When the Mistress learns of the engagement she arranges the weeding.

One day, the Mistress falls ill and asks the fake Rashid to sing the song that he sang in his childhood, but he cannot. At that moment, Janu comes with the real Rashid, who successfully sings the  song. The identity of fake Rashid is revealed, Rashid reunites with his family after his years-long absence, and the Mistress arranges a marriage between Sara and Janu.

Cast 
 Nadeem as Janu
 Shabnam as Sara
 Sabiha Khanam as Malkin
 Qavi Khan as Rashid
 Munawar Saeed as a criminal
 Nayyar Sultana as fakirni (guest appearance)

Soundtrack

Impact 

The film was remade in Bollywood as Namak. It starred Sanjay Dutt and was released in 1996.

Awards and nominations 
At 1975 Nigar Awards, the film received two awards;
 Best Lyrics - Masroor Anwar
 Best Female Singer - Naheed Akhtar

References

External links 

 

1975 films
Pakistani action drama films
1975 drama films
1970s Urdu-language films
1970s action drama films
1975 action films
Nigar Award winners
Urdu-language Pakistani films